LIFE Church UK, formerly the Abundant Life Church, is a Christian megachurch established and based in Bradford, England. The church has additional facilities in Warsaw and describes itself as "one church, three locations" (Bradford, Warsaw and Online). Sunday services are regularly streamed online. In 2003 it had an attendance of over 2,000 people; by 2006, the figure had climbed to 2,800.

History
LIFE Church has its roots in the Charismatic Restoration movement of Arthur Wallis. It was founded in 1976 by Bryn Jones, one of the early Restoration/British New Church leaders, by an amalgamation of three small Bradford churches: a charismatic Brethren Assembly based at the Bolton Woods Gospel Hall; an independent charismatic church made up mostly of former Baptists who had been unable to continue in their church because of their charismatic beliefs; and the New Covenant Church, a fellowship originally under the apostolic leadership of G. W. North.

In its early days it met in the Anglican Church House and so was known locally as Church House. Later known as Abundant Life Church for a number of years, in 2012 the name was shortened to LIFE Church, reflecting a move into a season of new leadership and direction.

Since 2000, LIFE Church has become more widely known through its regular radio and television broadcasts. Programmes are broadcast on God TV, United Christian Broadcasters, Australian Christian Channel and several other stations around the world. The church also has a weekly half-hour slot on Cross Rhythms radio. Many of the programmes broadcast on TV and radio are also available as podcasts and on YouTube.

The church organises annual conferences and events which are attended by Christians the UK and beyond. Their Women's Conference 'Cherish' has outgrown the Bradford campus and is now hosted at the Leeds First Direct Arena.

Facilities
The church's main location is in Bradford, West Yorkshire, but it also has a campus in Warsaw, Poland. The Bradford campus has a coffee shop, serving coffee from local roasters North Star Coffee, and connected to the youth building is a skatepark.

College 
Life Church College is based in Bradford, England.

Leadership
Paul Scanlon was the senior pastor of the church until 2012, having been part of the team alongside his wife Glenda since 1980. In 1997, he led the then Abundant Life Church during a period of transition that later became known as 'Crossing Over', during which it left Covenant Ministries. In 2012, Paul and Glenda’s eldest daughter and son in law; husband and wife, Steve and Charlotte Gambill were appointed as lead pastors of the church. 

In 2021, it was announced that Charlotte Gambill would step down from paid employment for church but would remain as the Lead Pastor alongside her husband, Steve. 

In 2021, David and Abigail Niblock were the Leeds campus Pastors, Maciek and Iga Liziniewicz were the Warsaw campus Pastors, Jock and Shirley James were the Bradford campus Pastors and Liam and Natalie Gordon were the Belfast campus Pastors.

In 2022, it was announced that the Leeds campus would be leaving LIFE Church, and they have since changed into “North^Church”. It was also announced in May 2022 that Liam and Natalie Gordon would be stepping down as campus pastors, and that the Belfast campus would be closing.

As of June 2022, Jock and Shirley James are the lead pastors of the church, and Maciek and Iga Liziniewicz are the Warsaw campus pastors.

Music
The church has produced a number of albums and singles, mainly recorded live. They also publish music from church services and conferences online. The early recordings were distributed by Kingsway Communications and later albums by Integrity Music. Dance Again, a live album released in May 2014 entered UK Albums Chart in the top 40.

Discography

References

1976 establishments in England
Evangelical megachurches in the United Kingdom
British record labels
Christian record labels
Churches in West Yorkshire
British New Church Movement
Christian organizations established in 1976